Aethalochroa is a genus of praying mantis in the family Toxoderidae.
 Aethalochroa affinis
 Aethalochroa ashmoliana (Iranian stick mantis)
 Aethalochroa indica
 Aethalochroa insignis (Indian stick mantis)
 Aethalochroa simplicipes
 Aethalochroa spinipes

See also
List of mantis genera and species

References

 
Insects of India
Toxoderidae
Mantodea genera